Clive Mantle (born 3 June 1957) is an English actor. He came to prominence for his role as Little John in the 1980s fantasy series Robin of Sherwood; he played the role of Dr Mike Barrett in the BBC hospital drama series Casualty and Holby City in the 1990s.

Television

Filmography

Notes and references

Discographies of British artists
Male actor filmographies
British filmographies